Enixotrophon macquariensis is a species of sea snail, a marine gastropod mollusk in the family Muricidae, the murex snails or rock snails.

Description

Distribution
This marine species occurs off Macquarie Island .

References

 Powell, A. W. B. (1957). Mollusca of Kerguelen and Macquarie Islands. In: Reports B.A.N.Z. Antarctic Research Expedition, 1929-1931. Series B (Zoology and botany), 6: 107-149.
 Marshall B.A. & Houart R. (2011) The genus Pagodula (Mollusca: Gastropoda: Muricidae) in Australia, the New Zealand region and the Tasman Sea. New Zealand Journal of Geology and Geophysics 54(1): 89–114. [Published March 2011] page(s): 114

External links
 Barco, A.; Marshall, B.; A. Houart, R.; Oliverio, M. (2015). Molecular phylogenetics of Haustrinae and Pagodulinae (Neogastropoda: Muricidae) with a focus on New Zealand species. Journal of Molluscan Studies. 81(4): 476-488

Gastropods described in 1957
Enixotrophon